The men's 50 kilometres race walk at the 1934 European Athletics Championships was held in Turin, Italy, on 8 September 1934.

Medalists

Results

Final
8 September

Participation
According to an unofficial count, 8 athletes from 6 countries participated in the event.

 (1)
 (1)
 (2)
 (2)
 (1)
 (1)

References

50 kilometres race walk
Racewalking at the European Athletics Championships